Torokina Airfield, also known as Cape Torokina Airfield, is a former World War II airfield located at Cape Torokina, Bougainville.

History

World War II
The 3rd Marine Division landed on Bougainville on 1 November 1943 at the start of the Bougainville Campaign, establishing a beachhead around Cape Torokina. The airfield became operational on December 10, 1943 when VMF-216 landed with 18 F4U Corsairs.

On 9 March 1944, the Japanese shelled the airfield and forced the squadrons that were based there to take off to avoid damage to their aircraft. Royal New Zealand Air Force squadrons also began operating from the airfield from January 1, 1944. Units assigned to the airfield included:

United States Navy
VC-40 operating Grumman TBF Avengers
ACORN 13
VF(N)-75 operating Vought F4U Corsairs
VF-17 with Corsair
United States Marine Corps
VMTB-233 operating TBF Avengers
VMF-211 operating F4U Corsairs
VMF-212 operating F4U Corsairs
VMF-215 operating F4U Corsairs
VMF-216 operating F4U Corsairs
VMF(N)-531 operating Lockheed PV-1 Ventura night-fighters
Royal New Zealand Air Force
No. 19 Squadron operating F4U Corsairs

Postwar
Today the airfield is no longer used and most of the runway is overgrown with vegetation.

See also

Piva Airfield
United States Army Air Forces in the South Pacific Area

References

External links
Torokina Airfield

Airfields of the United States Army Air Forces in the South West Pacific theatre of World War II
Seabees
World War II sites in Papua New Guinea